Ernesto Pellegrini (born 14 December 1940) is an Italian catering businessman and the former owner of Inter Milan from 1984 to 1995.

Life and career
The son of a farmer, in the early 1960s Pellegrini worked as an accountant for the bicycle manufacturing company Bianchi, earning L50,000 per month. In 1964, he was promoted to chief accountant, but instead, he asked for more work within the company, becoming the manager of the canteen. Here, he started his ascendancy in the catering industry, and in 1965 he founded the Organizzazione Mense Pellegrini following the realisation that the Italian economic miracle was facilitating the expansion of the Italian food industry, thanks to Italian population's more disposable income and new food habits. In 1975, his company changed its status to Pellegrini S.p.A., which over time expanded to include services such as meal tickets, corporate, health, and school catering services, sanitation and industrial cleaning services, and welfare services in Italy.

In 2019, Pellegrini S.p.A. made €600 million profit and employed circa 6,500 people.

Chairman of Inter Milan
In 1979, Pellegrini wrote a letter to the Inter's chairman Ivanoe Fraizzoli, asking to be allowed to contribute financially to the club and, as a result, being admitted as a member of the board. Pellegrini purchased Inter from Ivanoe Fraizzoli in 1984, becoming the club's 17th chairman.

Under his ownership, Inter purchased players such as Karl-Heinz Rummenigge, Lothar Matthäus, Jürgen Klinsmann and Andreas Brehme, winning the record-breaking 1988–89 Serie A together with two UEFA Cups and one Supercoppa Italiana.

In 2020, he was inducted into Inter Milan Hall of Fame.

Orders
Knight: Order of Merit for Labour: 1990

References

1940 births
Living people
Italian football chairmen and investors
20th-century Italian businesspeople
21st-century Italian businesspeople
Inter Milan chairmen and investors